Montecilfone (Arbërisht: Munxhufuni) is an Arbëreshë comune in the Province of Campobasso, in the Italian region of Molise, located about  northeast of Campobasso.

Montecilfone borders the following municipalities: Guglionesi, Montenero di Bisaccia, Palata.

References

Arbëresh settlements
Cities and towns in Molise